Argjend Beqiri (Arǵend Beḱiri, ; born 3 April 1974 in Gostivar) is a Macedonian retired international footballer and manager of Albanian ethnicity, who most recently manages Ferizaj. Beqiri has been capped 17 times for Macedonia.

International career 
He made his senior debut for North Macedonia in a March 1996 friendly match against Malta and has earned a total of 17 caps, scoring 1 goal. His final international was an October 2001 FIFA World Cup qualification match against Slovakia.

Honours
Sloga Jugomagnat
Macedonian First League: 1999, 2000, 2001
Macedonian Cup: 1996, 2000, 2004

Personal

1. MFL: Top Scorer 1999–2000, 2000–01

References

External links
 
 Argjend Beqiri at MacedonianFootball.com 
 2005–06 Statistics & 
  2004–05 Statistics at Eurosoccer.ch 

1974 births
Living people
People from Gostivar
Albanian footballers from North Macedonia
Association football forwards
Macedonian footballers
North Macedonia international footballers
FK Teteks players
FK Sloga Jugomagnat players
Royal Antwerp F.C. players
KF Shkëndija players
FC Aarau players
FK Renova players
Macedonian First Football League players
Belgian Pro League players
Challenger Pro League players
Swiss Super League players
Macedonian expatriate footballers
Expatriate footballers in Belgium
Macedonian expatriate sportspeople in Belgium
Expatriate footballers in Switzerland
Macedonian expatriate sportspeople in Switzerland
Macedonian football managers
KF Gostivari managers
KF Ferizaj managers
Macedonian expatriate football managers
Expatriate football managers in Kosovo
Macedonian expatriate sportspeople in Kosovo